Live from Tokyo may refer to
Live from Tokyo (album), an album by The Flying Burrito Brothers
Live from Tokyo (EP), an EP by Superfly